Mount Crillon is a high peak of the Fairweather Range, the southernmost part of the Saint Elias Mountains. It lies southeast of Mount Fairweather, in the promontory between the Gulf of Alaska and Glacier Bay. It is included in Glacier Bay National Park. The peak was named after Felix-Francois-Dorothee de Bretton, Comte de Crillon, by his friend, the French explorer Jean Francois de Galaup de la Perouse.


Location
Mount Crillon lies about 20 miles (32 km) southeast of Mount Fairweather. It is near the southern end of the Fairweather Range, with only one 10,000 foot (3,050m) peak, Mount La Perouse, lying south of it. It is  due east of the head of Lituya Bay, a small inlet of the Gulf of Alaska, which is itself part of the Pacific Ocean. The North and South Crillon Glaciers flow west from the peak toward Lituya Bay. The La Perouse Glacier flows south from the peak. The north side of the peak forms the head of the southern branch of the Johns Hopkins Glacier, which empties into Johns Hopkins Inlet, off of Glacier Bay. To the east of the peak lies the large icefield which forms the head of the Brady Glacier, the southernmost of the large glaciers of the Saint Elias Mountains.

Features
Due to its proximity to the ocean, it is often subject to harsh weather.

Climbing
Mount Crillon is not climbed frequently, since it is an extremely challenging climb for its elevation due to its isolation.  The first ascent was in 1934, by explorer Bradford Washburn on his third attempt,  and longtime editor of the American Alpine Journal H. Adams Carter.   They climbed via the East Ridge above the Plateau, reaching the summit on 19 July 1934.

Climate

Based on the Köppen climate classification, Mount Crillon has a subarctic climate with cold, snowy winters, and mild summers. Temperatures can drop below −20 °C with wind chill factors below −30 °C. Precipitation runoff and meltwater from its glaciers drains into Glacier Bay and the Gulf of Alaska.

See also

List of mountain peaks of North America
List of mountain peaks of the United States
List of mountain peaks of Alaska
List of Ultras of the United States

References

Sources

External links

 Mount Crillon on Topozone
 Mount Crillon on bivouac.com
 A page on La Perouse

Landforms of Hoonah–Angoon Census Area, Alaska
Mountains of Glacier Bay National Park and Preserve
Saint Elias Mountains
Mountains of Unorganized Borough, Alaska
Mountains of Alaska